Sunrise is a 1927 Australian silent film co-directed by Raymond Longford, who took over during filming. It was the second film from Australasian Films following their recommencement of production, after Painted Daughters.

It is considered a lost film.

Plot
George Willis loses his unfaithful wife in a rock fall and takes to the bush. He rescues a girl, Hope Stuart, from a flood and nurses her back to health. When he brings her back to her father he discovers that an old enemy, Arthur Greerson, has accused him of murder.

Greerson is injured in a mining accident and after George rescues him, Greerson admits he has lied. George returns to his life as a recluse in the mountains, followed by Hope.

Cast
Phyllis du Barry as Hope Stuart
Robert Travers as George Willis
Zara Clinton as Elsa Willis
Harry Hodson as Old Ben
Charles Villiers
Dunstan Webb as Arthur Greerson
Dick Thonton

Production
The film was shot on location at the Avon Dam near Bargo with interiors at the studios of Australasian Films in Bondi. F. Stuart Whyte began directing but left Australia during shooting for unknown reasons. He was replaced by Longford, who had recently contracted to Australasian Films.

References

External links

Sunrise at National Film and Sound Archive

Films from Australasian Films
1926 films
Australian drama films
Australian silent feature films
Australian black-and-white films
Lost Australian films
Films directed by Raymond Longford
1926 lost films
Lost drama films
Silent drama films
1920s English-language films